The Patuxent Range or macizo Armada Argentina is a major range of the Pensacola Mountains, comprising the Thomas Hills, Anderson Hills, Mackin Table and various nunataks and ridges bounded by the Foundation Ice Stream, Academy Glacier and the Patuxent Ice Stream. Discovered and partially photographed on January 13, 1956 in the course of a transcontinental nonstop plane flight by personnel of U.S. Navy Operation Deep Freeze I from McMurdo Sound to Weddell Sea and return.

Named by Advisory Committee on Antarctic Names (US-ACAN) for the Naval Air Station Patuxent River (at Cedar Point, Maryland) located on the south side of the mouth of the Patuxent River. The range was mapped in detail by USGS from surveys and U.S. Navy air photos, 1956-66.

Key geographic features 
 O'Connell Nunatak is a peaked rock nunatak, standing 6 nautical miles (11 km) south-southeast of Mount Murch in the southern Anderson Hills. Named by US-ACAN for Richard V. O'Connell, seismologist at Amundsen–Scott South Pole Station, winter 1967.
Named by US.ACAN for Jay T. Shurley, biologist at Amundsen–Scott South Pole Station, summer 1966-67.
Named by US-ACAN for Lt. Sidney Tolchin (MC) U.S. Navy, officer in charge of the Amundsen–Scott South Pole Station in the winter of 1959.
Mount Warnke , stands  NE of Martin Peak in the Thomas Hills. Named by US-ACAN for Detlef A. Warnke, biologist at Palmer Station, 1966-67.
Named by US-ACAN for Leonard S. Yarbrough, industrial engineer at Plateau Station, 1965-66.

Features
Geographical features include:

Anderson Hills

Thomas Hills

Other features

 Bennett Spires
 Bessinger Nunatak
 Blake Rock
 Brazitis Nunatak
 Brooks Nunatak
 Brown Ridge
 DesRoches Nunataks
 DeWitt Nunatak
 Foundation Ice Stream
 Houk Spur
 Lawrence Nunatak
 Lekander Nunatak
 Mackin Table
 Mount Bragg
 Mount Campleman
 Mount Dover
 Mount Dumais
 Mount Wanous
 Mount Weininger
 Natani Nunatak
 Patuxent Ice Stream
 Patuxent
 Pecora Escarpment
 Phillips Nunatak
 Plankington Bluff
 Postel Nunatak
 Snake Ridge
 Stout Spur
 Sullivan Peaks
 White Nunataks

References

Mountain ranges of Queen Elizabeth Land
.
Transantarctic Mountains